Kingston and Surbiton is a constituency created in 1997 represented in the House of Commons of the UK Parliament since 2017 by Ed Davey, the Leader of the Liberal Democrats. Kingston and Surbiton has been considered a marginal seat, as well as a swing seat since 2010, as the seat has changed hands twice since that year, and its winner's majority did not exceed 6.6% of the vote since the 13.2% majority won in 2010. In 2019, Davey won a 17.2% majority and a majority of the votes cast and the seat is now a safe seat for the party.

Boundaries 

1997–2010: The Royal Borough of Kingston upon Thames wards of Berrylands, Burlington, Chessington North, Chessington South, Grove, Hook, Malden Manor, Norbiton Park, Norbiton, St James, St Mark's, Surbiton Hill, Tolworth East, Tolworth South, and Tolworth West.

2010–present: As above less Burlington plus Beverley — and neighbouring Tolworth and Hook wards having been in local government renamed to become Alexandra, Tolworth and Hook Rise, Chessington North and Hook.

The constituency covers most of the Royal Borough of Kingston upon Thames, covering the town of Surbiton, Chessington, New Malden, Tolworth and the south of Kingston itself.  The remainder of the borough, a northern part of Kingston, has remained since 1997 in the Richmond Park seat.

2007 boundary review 
As part of its Fifth Periodic Review of Westminster constituencies, the Boundary Commission made minor changes to re-align the constituency boundaries with the boundaries of the local government divisions (wards); moving the entirety of the Beverley ward into Kingston and Surbiton. It had been partly in Richmond Park until 2002 local elections. The associated public consultation received 11 submissions, of which 10 in support. The revisions came into effect at the 2010 general election.

History 
The constituency was created in 1997, when the number of seats covering the boroughs of Kingston upon Thames and Richmond upon Thames was reduced from four to three.  It replaced the former Surbiton constituency completely and also covers the south of the former Kingston constituency.

Political history
Former Chancellor of the Exchequer Norman Lamont represented Kingston from a by-election in 1972 until the 1997 general election, when he was not selected as the Conservative candidate for either of its replacements.  Instead, the incumbent Surbiton MP Richard Tracey was selected, while Lamont unsuccessfully contested Harrogate and Knaresborough in North Yorkshire.  In the event, Tracey was defeated by the Liberal Democrat candidate Edward Davey by the very narrow margin of 56 votes.

In the 2011 referendum on whether the UK should adopt the Alternative Vote (AV) system, the Royal Borough of Kingston upon Thames, which covers most of the constituency, voted against the proposal by 60.5%.

Davey held on to the seat until the general election of 2015, when he was defeated by the Conservative James Berry during the national Liberal Democrat vote collapse. The 2015 result gave the seat the 26th most marginal majority of the Conservative Party's 331 seats by percentage of majority.

In the 2016 referendum on the UK's membership of the European Union, the borough voted to remain in the European Union by 61.6%.

Davey, now knighted, regained the seat for the Liberal Democrats in the 2017 general election with the eighth largest vote share increase for the party nationally.

The local council, which covers most of the constituency, alternates between Liberal Democrat majority control (1994–1998 and 2002–2014) and no overall control (1986–1994 and 1998–2002). However, in 2014, it became a Conservative-majority council; the last Conservative administration was between 1964 and 1986. Traditionally, the southern wards vote for the Liberal Democrats, whereas the north and north-eastern wards vote for the Conservatives, with some Labour representation in the Norbiton ward.

In all seven elections since its establishment, Kingston and Surbiton has voted for a candidate from the same party as the neighbouring constituency of Twickenham, which was established at the same time. Both seats have seen one Conservative win and six Liberal Democrat wins.

Profile 
The seat is a majority middle-class suburbia, much like its neighbouring constituencies of Wimbledon, Richmond Park and Twickenham. The area has a long-established large urban kernel in Kingston town centre, where waves of public initiatives and spending have overhauled much of the area's cohort of ex-council housing and social housing. This is similar to the proportion of such housing stock in the London Boroughs of Merton and Sutton adjoining. The highly commercial town with ancient-founded markets and a public riverside by the River Thames has enjoyed continued economic diversity and prosperity and saw in 2007 a total retail spend of £23.71 billion, placing it 12th among UK towns and cities.

Members of Parliament

Elections

Elections in the 2010s

Elections in the 2000s

Elections in the 1990s

See also 
List of parliamentary constituencies in London

Notes

References

External links 
Politics Resources (Election results from 1922 onwards)
Electoral Calculus (Election results from 1955 onwards)
Royal Borough of Kingston upon Thames
Kingston and Surbiton MP – Edward Davey TheyWorkForYou.com

Parliamentary constituencies in London
Politics of the Royal Borough of Kingston upon Thames
Surbiton
Constituencies of the Parliament of the United Kingdom established in 1997